Phil Moss (born 5 October 1971) is an English-born Australian association football manager and former player who was most recently assistant coach of Sydney FC.

Early life
Moss was born in London, England to Jewish parents and arrived in Australia as a child. His younger brother, Jonathan later became a first-class cricketer.

He attended Sydney Church of England Grammar School from 1984–1989.

Career

Playing career
Moss came through the ranks at Manly United before making his first grade debut at 17, and enjoyed a season at the Central Coast Coasties in 1997, ironically alongside his new colleague, in Mariners Head of Sports Science Andrew Clark. Moss then made his mark in the old National Soccer League under Graham Arnold as a defender come midfielder at Northern Spirit via a short spell at Eastern Suburbs, before ultimately returning to his old stomping ground.

Moss represented Australia in football at the 1997 Maccabiah Games. At the games opening ceremony a bridge he was about to step onto collapsed, killing several members of the Australian team and injuring a number of others including his brother Jonathan.

Coaching career
At Cromer Park, Moss was player coach briefly before taking the reins as Head Coach, and steering the club toward the NSW Premier League.

Before entering as a coach at State League level, Phil had coached Dee Why Football Club in 1996, who were at the time a Premier League team in the Manly Warringah Football Association competition. It was here that he made his mark winning the Grand Final, beating Pittwater RSL (2-1), winning the MWFA Cup (knockout competition), then winning the MWFA sixaside competition and even taking the team to defeat Manly United's first grade squad in an exhibition match on Cromer Park's number one field.

Moss served for two years as an assistant coach with the Olyroos. He assisted Graham Arnold during the successful qualification campaign for the 2008 Beijing Olympics with the Olyroos.

After serving served as Graham Arnold's assistant at the Mariners from July 2010, Moss was appointed the new manager of the Central Coast Mariners on 14 November 2013. He succeeded Graham Arnold, who was signed by J.League team Vegalta Sendai. Prior to his appointment, Moss had held the assistant coaching role at the Mariners for three seasons; over this time the club won one championship, one premiership and made the grand final in two of the three seasons of his tenure. 
Under Moss, the Mariners managed third-placed finish in the A-League. After defeating Adelaide United in the elimination finals, the Mariners were eventually eliminated by the Western Sydney Wanderers in the semi-finals.

On 6 March 2015, Moss was sacked by the Mariners.

Moss later took legal action against the Mariners on the basis of wrongful dismissal, having been dismissed just seven months into a three-year contract, with Moss claiming the balance of his $150,000 salary plus breach-of-contract damages. He eventually received approximately $500,000 from the Mariners; this sum is believed to be the biggest payout over a coach's sacking in A-League history.

Moss joined Sydney FC as assistant coach in June 2017. He left in June 2018.

Managerial statistics

References

1971 births
A-League Men managers
Australian people of English-Jewish descent
Australian soccer players
English footballers
English emigrants to Australia
English Jews
Living people
Jewish footballers
Maccabiah Games competitors for Australia
Footballers from Greater London
Australian soccer coaches
English football managers
Manly United FC players
Central Coast Mariners FC non-playing staff
Competitors at the 1997 Maccabiah Games
Association football defenders
Jewish Australian sportspeople